Marzdaran Stadium of Tabriz is a stadium in Tabriz, Iran. It was previously used primarily for football matches and served as the home stadium of Shahrdari Tabriz. Currently it is used as a football academy and training grounds for Machine Sazi. The stadium holds 5,000 people and was built in 2014 by Municipality of Tabriz.

See also
 Sahand Stadium
 Takhti Stadium (Tabriz)

References

Football venues in Iran
Sports venues in Tabriz
Sports venues completed in 2014